Kantuiyeh (also Romanized as Kantū’īyeh; also known as Gatū’īyeh and Katū’īyeh) is a village in Qaleh Asgar Rural District, Lalehzar District, Bardsir County, Kerman Province, Iran. At the 2006 census, its population was 234, in 53 families.

References 

Populated places in Bardsir County